Juan Madariaga (1809–1879) was an Argentine general who participated in the civil wars of the nineteenth century.

Argentine generals
Argentine people of Basque descent
Unitarianists (Argentina)
1809 births
1879 deaths